The Brighton Area School District is a public school district in the metropolitan Detroit area. It serves the city of Brighton, townships of Green Oak, Genoa, Hamburg, Brighton in Livingston County and parts of Lyon Township in adjacent Oakland County. The district consists of seven schools. Four elementary schools containing grades kindergarten through fourth; two intermediate schools educate students in grades five through eighth; and the high school takes in grades nine through twelve.

In order to balance the budget, the school system was restructured. The elementary schools now house grades K-4, Maltby is grades 5 and 6, and Scranton is 7 and 8. The high school remains grades 9-12. Some of the elementary schools teach "Junior Kindergarten" for ages 4-5.

Schools

Elementary schools
 Spencer Road Elementary School
 Hawkins Elementary School
 Hilton Road Elementary School
 Hornung Elementary School

Lindbom Elementary School was closed in 2010 due to new budget cuts and is now vacant.

Intermediate/Middle Schools
 Maltby Intermediate School (Grades 5 and 6)
 Scranton Middle School (Grades 7 and 8)

High school
 Brighton High School
 The Bridge Alternative High School

Intergenerational Center
 Miller Early Childhood Center

The Miller school houses both kindergarten and senior facilities in one building. The kindergarten section of Miller was closed in 2009 due to budget cuts in the district.

Misc.
Brighton Education and Community Center

The BECC building was the first modern high school built for Brighton Area Schools. It was later used as the first Scranton Middle School, until a newer facility was built. It is now an administrative building for the district with Board meetings and other important school administrative functions held there. It is also the main mailing address of the school district.
 The Brighton Adult Alternative Education Program provides an alternative high school to Brighton Area Schools as well as the surrounding area; in addition, it provides high school completion and GED testing to students of all ages.

Sports
Known as the Brighton Bulldogs, Brighton teams play in the Kensington Lakes Conference.

External links
 Brighton Area Schools web site

References

Education in Livingston County, Michigan
School districts in Michigan